The 2000–01 Maltese FA Trophy (known as the Rothmans Trophy for sponsorship reasons) was the 63rd season since its establishment. The competition started on 24 December 2000 and ended on 17 May 2001 with the final, which Valletta won 3-0 against Birkirkara.

First round

|colspan="3" style="background:#fcc;"|24 December 2000

|-
|colspan="3" style="background:#fcc;"|27 December 2000

|-
|colspan="3" style="background:#fcc;"|28 December 2000

|-
|colspan="3" style="background:#fcc;"|31 December 2000

|-
|colspan="3" style="background:#fcc;"|4 February 2001

|-
|colspan="3" style="background:#fcc;"|4 March 2001

|}

Second round

|colspan="3" style="background:#fcc;"|27 March 2001

|}

Quarter-finals

|colspan="3" style="background:#fcc;"|5 May 2001

|-
|colspan="3" style="background:#fcc;"|6 May 2001

|}

Semi-finals

Final

References

External links
 RSSSF page

Malta
Maltese FA Trophy seasons
Cup